The Uitvoerend Bewind (Dutch for Executive Authority) was the name of the government of the Batavian Republic between 1798 and 1801. The president of the Uitvoerend Bewind was head of state of the Batavian Republic.

Unitarian Democrats
The political group of unitarian democrats was dissatisfied with the slowness of the progress of the Dutch parliament, the National Assembly of the Batavian Republic. They were in favour of a central authority, opposed federalism, and wanted general elections. Conservatives and moderates stood against such demands, and the country had become un-governable, without prospects of drafting a constitution. 

Under the leadership of Pieter Vreede, the unitarian democrats engineered a coup d'état on January 22, 1798, with the help of general Herman Willem Daendels, and began to rule as the Uitvoerend Bewind, which soon became highly unpopular among their own supporters in the country.

Second Uitvoerend Bewind
A second coup followed on June 12, 1798, with the goal of removing the impopular rule. An interim government was installed, which would reign until new elections would bring a new Representative Assembly, still under universal suffrage (This was replaced by census suffrage after the coup d'état of 1801).

Between 1798 and 1801, the president of the Uitvoerend Bewind was the head of state of the Batavian Republic, and not as previously, the president of the Assembly.

Dutch heads of state between 1798 and 1801
{|
! From
! To
! 
|- valign=top
| align="right" style="background:#f5fffa" | 25 January 1798
| align="right" style="background:#f5fffa" | 24 February 1798 
| Pieter Vreede
| rowspan=5 style="background:#dcdcdc" | UitvoerendBewind
|-
| align="right" style="background:#f5fffa" |25 February 1798
| align="right" style="background:#f5fffa" |24 March 1798
| Wijbo Fijnje
|-
| align="right" style="background:#f5fffa" |25 March 1798
| align="right" style="background:#f5fffa" |24 April 1798
| Stefanus Jacobus van Langen
|-
| align="right" style="background:#f5fffa" |25 April 1798
| align="right" style="background:#f5fffa" |24 May 1798
| Berend Wildrik
|-
| align="right" style="background:#f5fffa" |25 May 1798
| align="right" style="background:#f5fffa" |12 June 1798
| Johan Pieter Fokker
|- valign=top
| rowspan=5 align="right" style="background:#f5fffa" | 14 June 1798
| rowspan=5 align="right" style="background:#f5fffa" | 17 August 1798
| Jacobus Spoors
| rowspan=5 align="left" style="background:#f5f5f5" | IntermediairBestuur(InterimGovernment)
|-
| style="background:#90ee90" | Gerrit Jan Pijman
|-
| Alexander Gogel
|-
| Reinier Willem Tadama
|-
| Abraham Jacques la Pierre
|- valign=top
| align="right" style="background:#f5fffa" | 17 August 1798
| align="right" style="background:#f5fffa" | 16 September 1798
| style="background:#e0ffff" | Albert Willem Hoeth
| rowspan=39 align="left" style="background:#dcdcdc" | UitvoerendBewind
|- 
| align="right" style="background:#f5fffa" | 17 September 1798
| align="right" style="background:#f5fffa" | 16 October 1798
| style="background:#e6e6fa" | Johannes Willem van Hasselt
|- 
| align="right" style="background:#f5fffa" | 17 October 1798
| align="right" style="background:#f5fffa" | 16 November 1798
| style="background:#ffffe0" | François Ermerins
|- 
| align="right" style="background:#f5fffa" | 17 November 1798
| align="right" style="background:#f5fffa" | 16 December 1798
| style="background:#dcdcdc" | Anthonie Frederik Robbert Evert van Haersolte, Lord van Staverden
|-
| align="right" style="background:#f5fffa" | 17 December 1798
| align="right" style="background:#ffe4e1" | 16 January 1799
| style="background:#ffdead" | Joannes Franciscus Rudolphus van Hooff
|-
| align="right" style="background:#ffe4e1" | 17 January 1799
| align="right" style="background:#ffe4e1" | 16 February 1799
| style="background:#e0ffff" | Albert Willem Hoeth
|-
| align="right" style="background:#ffe4e1" | 17 February 1799 
| align="right" style="background:#ffe4e1" | 16 March 1799
| style="background:#e6e6fa" | Johannes Willem van Hasselt
|-
| align="right" style="background:#ffe4e1" | 17 March 1799
| align="right" style="background:#ffe4e1" | 16 April 1799
| style="background:#ffffe0" | François Ermerins
|-
| align="right" style="background:#ffe4e1" | 17 April 1799
| align="right" style="background:#ffe4e1" | 16 May 1799
| style="background:#dcdcdc" | Anthonie Frederik Robbert Evert van Haersolte, Lord van Staverden
|-
| align="right" style="background:#ffe4e1" | 17 May 1799
| align="right" style="background:#ffe4e1" | 16 June 1799
| style="background:#ffdead" | Joannes Franciscus Rudolphus van Hooff
|-
| align="right" style="background:#ffe4e1" | 17 June 1799
| align="right" style="background:#ffe4e1" | 16 July 1799
| style="background:#e0ffff" | Albert Willem Hoeth
|-
| align="right" style="background:#ffe4e1" | 17 July 1799
| align="right" style="background:#ffe4e1" | 16 August 1799
| style="background:#eee8aa" | Augustijn Gerhard Besier
|-
| align="right" style="background:#ffe4e1" | 17 August 1799
| align="right" style="background:#ffe4e1" | 16 September 1799
| style="background:#ffffe0" | François Ermerins
|-
| align="right" style="background:#ffe4e1" | 17 September 1799
| align="right" style="background:#ffe4e1" | 16 October 1799
| style="background:#dcdcdc" | Anthonie Frederik Robbert Evert van Haersolte, Lord van Staverden
|-
| align="right" style="background:#ffe4e1" | 17 October 1799
| align="right" style="background:#ffe4e1" | 16 November 1799 
| style="background:#ffdead" | Joannes Franciscus Rudolphus van Hooff
|-
| align="right" style="background:#ffe4e1" | 17 November 1799
| align="right" style="background:#ffe4e1" | 16 December 1799
| style="background:#e0ffff" | Albert Willem Hoeth
|-
| align="right" style="background:#ffe4e1" | 17 December 1799
| align="right" style="background:#f0f8ff" | 16 January 1800
| style="background:#eee8aa" | Augustijn Gerhard Besier
|-
| align="right" style="background:#f0f8ff" | 17 January 1800
| align="right" style="background:#f0f8ff" | 16 February 1800
| style="background:#ffffe0" | François Ermerins
|-
| align="right" style="background:#f0f8ff" | 17 February 1800
| align="right" style="background:#f0f8ff" | 16 March 1800
| style="background:#dcdcdc" | Anthonie Frederik Robbert Evert van Haersolte, Lord van Staverden
|-
| align="right" style="background:#f0f8ff" | 17 March 1800
| align="right" style="background:#f0f8ff" | 16 April 1800
| style="background:#ffdead" | Joannes Franciscus Rudolphus van Hooff
|-
| align="right" style="background:#f0f8ff" | 17 April 1800
| align="right" style="background:#f0f8ff" | 16 May 1800
| style="background:#e0ffff" | Albert Willem Hoeth
|-
| align="right" style="background:#f0f8ff" | 17 May 1800
| align="right" style="background:#f0f8ff" | 16 June 1800
| style="background:#eee8aa" | Augustijn Gerhard Besier
|-
| align="right" style="background:#f0f8ff" | 17 June 1800
| align="right" style="background:#f0f8ff" | 16 July 1800
| style="background:#ffffe0" | François Ermerins
|-
| align="right" style="background:#f0f8ff" | 17 July 1800
| align="right" style="background:#f0f8ff" | 16 August 1800
| style="background:#dcdcdc" | Anthonie Frederik Robbert Evert van Haersolte, Lord van Staverden
|-
| align="right" style="background:#f0f8ff" | 17 August 1800
| align="right" style="background:#f0f8ff" | 16 September 1800
| style="background:#87cefa" | Jan Hendrik van Swinden
|-
| align="right" style="background:#f0f8ff" | 17 September 1800
| align="right" style="background:#f0f8ff" | 16 October 1800
| style="background:#e0ffff" | Albert Willem Hoeth
|-
| align="right" style="background:#f0f8ff" | 17 October 1800
| align="right" style="background:#f0f8ff" | 16 November 1800
| style="background:#eee8aa" | Augustijn Gerhard Besier
|-
| align="right" style="background:#f0f8ff" | 17 November 1800
| align="right" style="background:#f0f8ff" | 16 December 1800
| style="background:#ffffe0" | François Ermerins
|-
| align="right" style="background:#f0f8ff" | 17 December 1800
| align="right" style="background:#fff8dc" | 16 January 1801
| style="background:#dcdcdc" | Anthonie Frederik Robbert Evert van Haersolte, Lord van Staverden
|-
| align="right" style="background:#fff8dc" | 17 January 1801
| align="right" style="background:#fff8dc" | 16 February 1801 
| style="background:#87cefa" | Jan Hendrik van Swinden
|-
| align="right" style="background:#fff8dc" | 17 February 1801
| align="right" style="background:#fff8dc" | 16 March 1801
| style="background:#e0ffff" | Albert Willem Hoeth
|-
| align="right" style="background:#fff8dc" | 17 March 1801
| align="right" style="background:#fff8dc" | 16 April 1801
| style="background:#eee8aa" | Augustijn Gerhard Besier
|-
| align="right" style="background:#fff8dc" | 17 April 1801
| align="right" style="background:#fff8dc" | 16 May 1801
| style="background:#ffffe0" | François Ermerins
|-
| align="right" style="background:#fff8dc" | 17 May 1801
| align="right" style="background:#fff8dc" | 16 June 1801
| style="background:#dcdcdc" | Anthonie Frederik Robbert Evert van Haersolte, Lord van Staverden
|-
| align="right" style="background:#fff8dc" | 17 June 1801
| align="right" style="background:#fff8dc" | 16 July 1801
| style="background:#87cefa" | Jan Hendrik van Swinden
|-
| align="right" style="background:#fff8dc" | 17 July 1801
| align="right" style="background:#fff8dc" | 16 August 1801
| style="background:#90ee90" | Gerrit Jan Pijman
|-
| align="right" style="background:#fff8dc" | 17 August 1801
| align="right" style="background:#fff8dc" | 16 September 1801
| style="background:#eee8aa" | Augustijn Gerhard Besier
|-
| align="right" style="background:#fff8dc" | 17 September 1801
| align="right" style="background:#fff8dc" | 16 October 1801
| style="background:#ffffe0" | François Ermerins
|-
| align="right" style="background:#fff8dc" | 17 October 1801
| align="right" style="background:#fff8dc" | 
| style="background:#dcdcdc" | Anthonie Frederik Robbert Evert van Haersolte, Lord van Staverden
|}

Political history of the Batavian Republic
1798 establishments in the Batavian Republic
1801 disestablishments in the Batavian Republic